Jostedal Glacier or  is the largest glacier in continental Europe. It is in Vestland county in Western Norway. Jostedalsbreen lies in the municipalities of Luster, Sogndal, Sunnfjord, and Stryn.

History
In 1906, work was being done on footpaths that could accommodate tourists.

Geography
The glacier covers over half of the national park.

The glacier is maintained by the high snowfall rates in the region, not the cold temperatures. This means the glacier has high melting rates in its snouts. The Jostedalsbreen has around 50 glacier arms such as the Nigardsbreen and Tunsbergdalsbreen in Jostedal, the Briksdalsbreen near Olden, the Bøyabreen by Fjærland, the Kjenndalsbreen, Tindefjellbreen near Loen, and Austerdalsbreen.
 
In 2012, the glacier arm Briksdalsbreen lost  of ice in a few months. More recent measurements now show that Briksdalsbreen retreated  in 2006, and could be in danger of breaking away from the upper icefield. Ice climbing has now been terminated because of this event.

See also 
 List of glaciers
 List of glaciers in Norway

References

Further reading

External links

Map at SNL.no
Jostedalsbreen National Park Centre
Jostedal Glacier National Park
Directorate for Nature Management - National Parks

Glaciers of Vestland
Sogndal
Sunnfjord
Luster, Norway
Stryn